was a district located in Ibaraki, Japan. The district was dissolved on March 27, 2006.

The district had only one village before dissolution:
 Tamari

Timeline (Heisei Era, 1989-2006)
 January 1, 1992 - The village of Chiyoda was elevated to town status.
 April 1, 1997 - The village of Dejima was elevated to town status and changed the name to Kasumigaura.
 March 28, 2005 - The town of Kasumigaura absorbed the town of Chiyoda to create the city of Kasumigaura.
 October 1, 2005 - The town of Yasato was merged into the expanded city of Ishioka.
 February 20, 2006 - The village of Niihari was merged into the expanded city of Tsuchiura.
 March 27, 2006 - The village of Tamari was merged with the towns of Ogawa and Minori (both from Higashiibaraki District) to create the city of Omitama. Niihari District was dissolved as a result of this merger.

Former districts of Ibaraki Prefecture